"I've Got a Rock 'n' Roll Heart" is a single by Eric Clapton from his album Money and Cigarettes released in January 1983. The release was successful in the United States, peaking at 18 on the Billboard Hot 100 and reached number 6 on the Adult Contemporary chart the same year.

Adaptation
In 2010, it was used as part of an advertisement campaign for a Fender edition of the T-Mobile HTC Magic myTouch 3G telephone. Clapton also appeared in the commercial, and resurrected the song for his North American tour with Roger Daltrey. This re-boosted popularity of the song, and as of February 2010 the song had shifted 112,798 digital downloads in the United States.

Chart positions

Weekly charts

References

Eric Clapton songs
1983 singles
1983 songs
Songs written by Troy Seals
Song recordings produced by Tom Dowd
Songs written by Eddie Setser
Warner Records singles